Temples of Ice is the seventh studio album by English heavy metal band Venom. The album was originally supposed to be produced by ex-Child's Play producer Howard Benson; however, he was unavailable. The band decided to stay with Kevin Ridley, who co-produced the band's previous album Prime Evil. It was released on Under One Flag records in 1991, and marketed and distributed by Music for Nations.

Track listing

Personnel
Venom
 Tony "Demolition Man" Dolan – vocals, bass
 Jeff "Mantas" Dunn – guitar
 Al Barnes – guitar
 Anthony "Abaddon" Bray – drums

Production
 Engineered by Kevin Ridley
 Mixed by Kevin Ridley and Pete Peck at Great Linford Manor, England

References

External links
Venom official website

1991 albums
Venom (band) albums
Albums produced by Kevin Ridley